Grammodes oculicola, the small-eyed box-owlet, is a moth of the family Noctuidae first described by Francis Walker in 1858. It is found in the South Pacific basin, from Australia to the Society Islands.

The wingspan is about 30 mm.

References

Ophiusina
Moths described in 1858